Naomi Kilekwa (born 5 October 1984) is a Malawian politician.

Kilekwa is a member of the National Assembly of Malawi for Mulanje South East. Her term began on 20 May 2014.

References

Living people
1984 births
21st-century Malawian politicians
21st-century women politicians
Members of the National Assembly (Malawi)
Democratic Progressive Party (Malawi) politicians